The Symbol Remains is the fifteenth studio album by American rock band Blue Öyster Cult, released on October 9, 2020.

The title comes from a lyric in the song "Shadow of California" on Blue Öyster Cult's 1983 LP The Revölution by Night.

This is the band's first studio release since 2001's Curse of the Hidden Mirror, making it the longest gap between the band's studio albums. It also marks the recording debut by long-time members Jules Radino and Richie Castellano, as well as the first studio album since 1985's Club Ninja to not feature Allen Lanier, who died in 2013.

Background 

The lack of sales of the band's previous studio album, Curse of the Hidden Mirror (2001), contributed to the band's disinterest in recording new music. Frontman Eric Bloom noted in 2017 that "it costs money to make a record", and that the time spent producing an album would be better spent touring "than making a record that nobody's going to buy." He did not, however, completely rule out the possibility of the band going back to the studio.

Lead guitarist Buck Dharma stated in another interview that the band had "tentative" plans to record in 2017, and noted that the then-current band was "so good it would be a shame not to." Dharma also revealed that he had originally intended to contact longtime band manager and collaborator Sandy Pearlman about ideas for the album, but Pearlman's death in 2016 from a stroke prevented that from happening.

In April 2019, Bloom said that a new album would eventually arrive, and announced that the band would "soon" be signing a new recording contract. In July 2019, it was announced that the band had signed with Frontiers Records and that the album would be released in 2020. Bloom noted that half of the songs were already written, with the remaining portion to be written during production of the album.

The album art and track listing were revealed in August 2020.

Songs
Several singles and music videos were released to promote the album. On August 28, 2020, "That Was Me" and "Box in My Head" were released for streaming on YouTube. Several days later, a music video featuring former member Albert Bouchard was released for the former. A video was released for "Box in My Head" on September 10. Additionally, the band released a video for "Tainted Blood" on September 25. On the day of the album's release, the band released a video for "The Alchemist".

According to Buck Dharma, "Box in My Head" is about "trying to intrigue a lady" and that the mind is an "enigmatic and curious place". It features lyrics by novelist John Shirley, a frequent collaborator of the band. "The Alchemist" references the H.P. Lovecraft short story The Alchemist, while "Florida Man" references the internet meme of the same name. The Castellano-penned "The Return of St. Cecilia" references a song from the album that the band recorded for Elektra Records in 1970 under the name "Stalk-Forrest Group". Another Castellano contribution, "The Machine", is about cell phones.

A different recording of the song "Fight" had been released by Buck Dharma in 2015, as a solo track. Additionally, demo recordings of two other songs, "Nightmare Epiphany" and "Secret Road" were released in 2000 in an archive compilation released by Dharma.

"Edge of the World" is a song about conspiracy theories and references alien abductions.

Reception

The Symbol Remains has received a positive reception from critics, and "The Alchemist" in particular has been the subject of particular praise. The album holds a 77/100 aggregate rating on Metacritic as of January 2021.

Dom Lawson of Blabbermouth.net gave the album a positive review, citing songs like "Box in My Head" and "The Alchemist" as high points on the album. Scott McLennan of The Arts Fuse hailed "The Alchemist" as "a sprawling tale of a cursed monarchy, palace treachery, and sorcery", and noting that Bloom's performance on the track was at "peak harrowing form". McLennan also praised Dharma's "speedy country-rock riff" playing on "Train True (Lennie's Song)". Thom Jurek of AllMusic hailed the album as a "thoroughly inspired" return for the band, and compared the sound of many of the album's songs to Blue Öyster Cult's back catalogue, as well as groups like Head East and Iron Maiden. 
Writing for BraveWords, Paul Stenning cited the material as "memorable" and marked out "Nightmare Epiphany", "Edge of the World" and "Stand and Fight" as standout tracks.

Meanwhile, a more neutral review in Uncut cited "The Machine", "Stand and Fight" and "The Alchemist" as the album's best moments.

Track listing

Personnel

Band
 Eric Bloom – guitars, keyboards, vocals
 Buck Dharma – guitars, keyboards, programming, vocals
 Richie Castellano – guitars, keyboards, programming, vocals
 Danny Miranda – bass guitar, backing vocals
 Jules Radino – drums, percussion, backing vocals

Additional musicians
 Albert Bouchard – backing vocals, cowbell and percussion on "That Was Me"
 Andy Ascolese – keyboards on "Nightmare Epiphany" and "Florida Man"; piano on "The Alchemist"
 David Lucas – backing vocals on "Edge of the World", "The Machine", "Florida Man" and "Secret Road"; cowbell on "Fight"
 Phil Castellano – harmonica on "Train True (Lennie's Song)"; gang vocals on "Stand and Fight"; backing vocals and claps on "Florida Man"; choir programming on "Secret Road"
 Kasim Sulton – backing vocals on "The Return of St. Cecilia" and "There's a Crime"
 Steve La Cerra – gang vocals on "Stand and Fight"; backing vocals and claps on "Florida Man"
 Kevin Young – gang vocals on "Stand and Fight"; backing vocals and claps on "Florida Man"
 John Castellano – backing vocal on "Florida Man"
 Jeff Nolan – theremin on "Fight"

Production 
 Produced by Eric Bloom, Buck Dharma and Richie Castellano
 Executive produced by Steve Schenk
 Chief Engineer – Richie Castellano
 Overdub engineering – Buck Dharma
 Engineer – Sam Stauff
 Assistant engineer – Steve La Cerra
 Mixed by Tom Lord-Alge
 Mastered by Ted Jensen

Charts
The album entered the Billboard 200 album chart at No. 192, making it their first album to chart in the United States since Imaginos in August 1988.

Notes

References 

2020 albums
Blue Öyster Cult albums